Zuhause im Glück – Unser Einzug in ein neues Leben (English: Happy at home – moving into a new life) - was a German television series, which was aired at 8:15 pm every Tuesday on RTL II. The first show could be watched on TV on 4 October 2005. On 2 November 2010 the 100th episode was aired. The concept of the show is based on the US-American show Extreme Makeover: Home Edition, which is produced by the TV channel ABC. In this TV show, it is shown how the interior architect Eva Brenner and architect John Kosmalla, as well as approximately 15 workers per show reconstruct diverse rooms in a house within 8 days that was affected by an unlucky incident. That is the reason why families often found themselves in a difficult situation. During the reconstruction work the family will stay in a hotel and is not allowed to get in touch with the building site. In 2009 Eva Brenner and John Kosmalla were supported by Natalie Nguyen-Ton, Christopher Brenner and Daniel Kraft, as well as by a new craftsmen team.

Until 2005, the family was given a DVD by a member of the building team during the first week of reconstruction. In this DVD, the happenings in their house were presented in a humorous way. Since 2007 the "Construction Message" was replaced by the "Construction Riddle". Eva Brenner sends three items from the building site to the hotel. The family has then to pick one of those items, which represent something. One item represents a blank, for the other two the family gets something in addition, for example a fireplace or an aquarium for their home. Two other categories, which recur in each episode, are "Eva’s handicraft tip" and "A craftsman tip". In these categories Eva or a craftsman tells the spectator how to do handicrafts for the home or how to paper a wall. Besides, in the category "Wolfgang’s Building Site ABC" the site manager explains the structure of a building site. The building team has its own kitchen in containers and motor homes, which are located right to the building site and which allows them to work 24/7.

Craftsmen team

At the moment, the team of Zuhause im Glück consists of 18 craftsmen. Recently, there were in total 24 different craftsmen.

Success
With more than 3 million TV spectators the soap belongs to one of the most successful RTL-2 productions. Furthermore, it is the most successful redecorating soap in Germany. The focus on handicraft advice contributes to this success significantly. In contrary to other decorating soaps in private TV this soap makes it not only possible to construct plasterboards, but also to install attic windows and to break down exceptionally many walls. The concept of a house will be changed fundamentally.

Other
A CD called 3D Haus & Video was published in addition to the show.

See also
List of German television series

External links
 

2005 German television series debuts
2010s German television series
German reality television series
German-language television shows
RTL Zwei original programming